Edward Lee Morgan (July 10, 1938 – February 19, 1972) was an American jazz trumpeter and composer.

One of the key hard bop musicians of the 1960s, Morgan came to prominence in his late teens, recording on John Coltrane's Blue Train (1957) and with the band of drummer Art Blakey before launching a solo career. Morgan stayed with Blakey until 1961 and started to record as leader in the late '50s. His song "The Sidewinder", on the album of the same name, became a surprise crossover hit on the pop and R&B charts in 1964, while Morgan's subsequent recordings found him touching on other styles of music such as post-bop and avant-garde jazz as his artistry matured. Soon after The Sidewinder was released, Morgan rejoined Blakey for a short period. After leaving Blakey for the final time, Morgan continued to work prolifically as both a leader and a sideman with the likes of Hank Mobley and Wayne Shorter, becoming a cornerstone of the Blue Note label.

Morgan died at the age of 33 when his common-law wife Helen Morgan shot and killed him following a confrontation at Slugs' Saloon, in New York City.

Biography
Edward Lee Morgan was born in Philadelphia, Pennsylvania, United States, on July 10, 1938, the youngest of Otto Ricardo and Nettie Beatrice Morgan's four children.

Originally interested in the vibraphone, he soon showed a growing enthusiasm for the trumpet. Morgan also knew how to play the alto saxophone. On his thirteenth birthday, his sister Ernestine gave him his first trumpet. His primary stylistic influence was Clifford Brown, with whom he took a few lessons as a teenager.

Morgan recorded prolifically from 1956 until a day before his death in February 1972. He joined Dizzy Gillespie's Big Band at 18 and remained as a member for a year and a half until economic circumstances forced Gillespie to disband the unit in 1958. Morgan began recording for Blue Note in 1956, eventually recording 25 albums as a leader for the label. He also recorded on the Vee-Jay label and one album for Riverside Records on its short-lived Jazzland subsidiary. He was a featured sideman on several early Hank Mobley records, and intermittently thereafter. On John Coltrane's Blue Train (1957), Morgan played a trumpet with an angled bell given to him by Gillespie.

Joining Art Blakey's Jazz Messengers in 1958, Morgan further developed his talent as a soloist and composer. He toured with Blakey for a few years, and was featured on numerous albums by the Messengers, including Moanin', which is one of the band's best-known recordings. When Benny Golson left the Jazz Messengers, Morgan persuaded Blakey to hire Wayne Shorter, a young tenor saxophonist, to fill the chair. This version of the Jazz Messengers, including pianist Bobby Timmons and bassist Jymie Merritt, recorded many albums during 1959–61, including for Blue Note Africaine, The Big Beat, [[A Night in Tunisia (1960 album)|A Night in Tunisia]] and The Freedom Rider. During his time with The Jazz Messengers, Morgan also wrote several tunes including "The Midget", "Haina", "Celine", "Yama," "Kozo's Waltz", "Pisces", and "Blue Lace." The drug problems of Morgan and Timmons forced them to leave the band in 1961, and the trumpeter returned to Philadelphia, his hometown. According to Tom Perchard, a Morgan biographer, it was Blakey who introduced the trumpeter to heroin, which impeded progression in his career. 

On returning to New York in 1963, he recorded The Sidewinder. The title track cracked the pop chart in 1964 and served as the background theme for Chrysler television commercials during the World Series. The tune was used without Morgan's consent; after he threatened to sue, Chrysler agreed not to show the advertisement again and settled the case. Due to the crossover success of "The Sidewinder" in a rapidly changing pop music market, Blue Note encouraged its other artists to emulate the tune's "boogaloo" beat. Morgan himself repeated the formula several times with compositions such as "Cornbread" (from the eponymous album Cornbread) and "Yes I Can, No You Can't" on The Gigolo. According to drummer Billy Hart, Morgan said he had recorded "The Sidewinder" as filler for the album, and was bemused that it had turned into his biggest hit. He felt that his playing was much more advanced on Grachan Moncur III's essentially avant-garde Evolution album, recorded a month earlier, on November 21, 1963.

After this commercial success, Morgan continued to record prolifically, producing such works as Search for the New Land (1964), which reached the top 20 of the R&B charts. He also briefly rejoined the Jazz Messengers after his successor, Freddie Hubbard, joined another group. Together with tenor saxophonist John Gilmore, pianist John Hicks, and bassist Victor Sproles, this lineup was filmed by the BBC for seminal jazz television program Jazz 625.

As the 1960s progressed, he recorded some twenty additional albums as a leader, and continued to record as a sideman on the albums of other artists, including Wayne Shorter's Night Dreamer; Stanley Turrentine's Mr. Natural; Freddie Hubbard's The Night of the Cookers; Hank Mobley's Dippin', A Caddy for Daddy, A Slice of the Top, Straight No Filter; Jackie McLean's Jackknife and Consequence; Joe Henderson's Mode for Joe; McCoy Tyner's Tender Moments; Lonnie Smith's Think and Turning Point; Elvin Jones' The Prime Element; Jack Wilson's Easterly Winds; Reuben Wilson's Love Bug; Larry Young's Mother Ship; Lee Morgan and Clifford Jordan Live in Baltimore 1968; Andrew Hill's Grass Roots; as well as on several albums with Art Blakey and the Jazz Messengers.

He became more politically involved in the last two years of his life, becoming one of the leaders of the Jazz and People's Movement. The group demonstrated during the taping of talk and variety shows during 1970-71 to protest the lack of jazz artists as guest performers and members of the programs' bands. His working band during those last years featured reed players Billy Harper or Bennie Maupin, pianist Harold Mabern, bassist Jymie Merritt and drummers Mickey Roker or Freddie Waits. Maupin, Mabern, Merritt, and Roker are featured on the well-regarded three-disc, Live at the Lighthouse, recorded during a two-week engagement at the Hermosa Beach club, California, in July 1970.

Death and legacy
Morgan was killed in the early hours of February 19, 1972, at Slugs' Saloon, a jazz club in New York City's East Village where his band was performing. Following an altercation between sets, Morgan's common-law wife Helen Moore (a.k.a. Helen Morgan) shot him.  The injuries were not immediately fatal, but the ambulance was slow in arriving on the scene as the city had experienced heavy snowfall that resulted in extremely difficult driving conditions. They took so long to get there that Morgan bled to death. He was 33 years old. Helen Morgan was arrested and spent a short time in prison before being released on parole. After her release, she returned to her native North Carolina and died there from a heart condition in March 1996.

Lee and Helen Morgan are the subjects of a 2016 documentary I Called Him Morgan by Swedish filmmaker Kasper Collin. The film premiered on September 1, 2016, at the 73rd Venice Film Festival and was theatrically released in the U.S. on March 24, 2017. In his New York Times review A. O. Scott called the film "a delicate human drama about love, ambition and the glories of music".

Discography

Further reading
Jeff McMillan DelightfuLee: The Life and Music of Lee Morgan (2008) University of Michigan Press
Tom Perchard Lee Morgan: His Life, Music and Culture'' (2006) Equinox

References

External links 
Masaya Matsumura's Lee Morgan Discography site
Lee Morgan discography
 
 
Lee Morgan playing his famous "Ceora" ballad

1938 births
1972 deaths
20th-century American musicians
American jazz trumpeters
American male trumpeters
Bebop trumpeters
Hard bop trumpeters
The Jazz Messengers members
Murdered African-American people
American murder victims
People murdered in New York City
Male murder victims
Musicians from Philadelphia
Savoy Records artists
Vee-Jay Records artists
Riverside Records artists
Blue Note Records artists
Jazz musicians from Pennsylvania
American male jazz musicians
20th-century American male musicians
Deaths by firearm in Manhattan